Nicholas Ramjass (born 2 November 1982) is a Trinidadian cricketer. He played in five Twenty20 matches for Trinidad and Tobago in 2006.

See also
 List of Trinidadian representative cricketers

References

External links
 

1982 births
Living people
Trinidad and Tobago cricketers